The arrondissement of Toulon is an arrondissement of France in the Var department in the Provence-Alpes-Côte d'Azur region. It has 32 communes.

Composition

The communes of the arrondissement of Toulon, and their INSEE codes, are:

 Bandol (83009)
 Le Beausset (83016)
 Belgentier (83017)
 Bormes-les-Mimosas (83019)
 La Cadière-d'Azur (83027)
 Carqueiranne (83034)
 Le Castellet (83035)
 Collobrières (83043)
 La Crau (83047)
 Cuers (83049)
 Évenos (83053)
 La Farlède (83054)
 La Garde (83062)
 Hyères (83069)
 Le Lavandou (83070)
 La Londe-les-Maures (83071)
 Ollioules (83090)
 Pierrefeu-du-Var (83091)
 Le Pradet (83098)
 Le Revest-les-Eaux (83103)
 Riboux (83105)
 Saint-Cyr-sur-Mer (83112)
 Saint-Mandrier-sur-Mer (83153)
 Sanary-sur-Mer (83123)
 La Seyne-sur-Mer (83126)
 Signes (83127)
 Six-Fours-les-Plages (83129)
 Solliès-Pont (83130)
 Solliès-Toucas (83131)
 Solliès-Ville (83132)
 Toulon (83137)
 La Valette-du-Var (83144)

History

The arrondissement of Toulon was created in 1800. At the January 2017 reorganisation of the arrondissements of Var, it lost two communes to the arrondissement of Brignoles.

As a result of the reorganisation of the cantons of France which came into effect in 2015, the borders of the cantons are no longer related to the borders of the arrondissements. The cantons of the arrondissement of Toulon were, as of January 2015:

 Le Beausset
 Collobrières
 La Crau
 Cuers
 La Garde
 Hyères-Est
 Hyères-Ouest
 Ollioules
 Saint-Mandrier-sur-Mer
 La Seyne-sur-Mer
 Six-Fours-les-Plages
 Solliès-Pont
 Toulon-1
 Toulon-2
 Toulon-3
 Toulon-4
 Toulon-5
 Toulon-6
 Toulon-7
 Toulon-8
 Toulon-9
 La Valette-du-Var

References

Toulon